Queens Road Peckham railway station is in the London Borough of Southwark and also serves the area to the east of Peckham, in the London Borough of Lewisham. It is on the road of that name and is in Travelcard Zone 2.

History

The station opened with the line on 13 August 1866, and had two wooden side platforms and an intermediate centre platform to serve the third centre line.

This link was re-instated on 9 December 2012 by London Overground.

The present island platform dates from the 1970s which is on a viaduct with the line: there are 48 steps leading to it, and one block of platform buildings.

Design
The station has step free access from platform to street via a lift. A ramp is required for wheelchair access to and from the train.

The station exits on to Queens Road in Peckham.

Services

The typical Monday-Saturday off peak service in trains per hour is:
4 to London Bridge, calling at 

One late night weekday service runs to  instead of Clapham Junction, following the former route of the South London Line prior to the inauguration of the ELL Phase 2 extension Two Monday to Friday services to Dalston Junction also start from there.

From May 2022 there will be 2 additional services to London Bridge, departing at 08:07 and 08:37 

On Sundays this is:
4 to London Bridge
2 to East Croydon
2 to Crystal Palace
4 to Clapham Junction
4 to  via Dalston Junction

Connections
London Buses routes 36, 136, 171, 177, 436, P12 and P13 and night routes N89, N136 and N171 serve the station.

References

External links

Station information from Southern

Railway stations in the London Borough of Southwark
Former London, Brighton and South Coast Railway stations
Railway stations in Great Britain opened in 1866
Railway stations served by Govia Thameslink Railway
Railway stations served by London Overground
Peckham
1866 establishments in England